Failla is a surname.

Notable bearers:
 James "Jimmy Brown" Failla (1919 – 1999), a senior caporegime with the Gambino crime family who was a major power
 Paul J. Failla (born 1972), a former American football and baseball player and coach
 Polk Failla (born 1969), a United States District Judge of the United States District Court for the Southern District of New York
 Clayton Failla (born 1986), a professional footballer currently playing for Maltese Premier League side Hibernians
 Gioacchino Failla (1891 – 1961), an Italian-born American physicist